Daniel Wilson (born November 1, 1993) is a Guyana association footballer who currently plays for Alpha United FC in the GFF National Super League, and the Guyana national football team.

Career
Wilson first signed for TP-47 in the Finnish third division with the aim of playing at a higher level within Europe. Despite a solid first season in the club, where he played regularly he returned to his homeland with Alpha United FC.

International career
Wilson made his debut for Guyana in a friendly match against India where he came on as a late substitute in Guyana's surprise 2–1 victory.

International goals
Scores and results list Guyana's goal tally first.

References

External links
 Daniel Wilson at Caribbean Football Database
 

1993 births
Living people
Association football midfielders
Guyanese footballers
Guyanese expatriate footballers
Guyana international footballers
Expatriate footballers in Finland
Guyanese expatriate sportspeople in Finland
Sportspeople from Georgetown, Guyana
Afro-Guyanese people
TP-47 players